Peter I Range, Peter the First Range or Peter the Great Range ( or Хребет Петра Первого) is a mountain range in Tajikistan, part of the Pamir Mountain System. The range takes its name from Peter the Great (1672 – 1725).

Geography
Peter I Range is located in the south-east of Jirgatol district in Tajikistan's Region of Republican Subordination. It forms a westerly extension of the northern Pamirs, separating the watersheds of the Surchob in the north and the Obikhingou river in the south. The range stretches in a roughly east–west direction for about 200 km, connecting with the Academy of Sciences Range at its eastern end.

Peaks
Its highest summit is Moscow Peak (6,785 m). Other peaks are Leningrad Peak (6,507 m), Abalakov Peak (6,446 m), Oshanin Peak (6,389 m), Kirov Peak (6,372 m), Kuybyshev Peak (6,189 m), and the ultra-prominent Agasis Peak (5,877 m).

See also
List of mountains in Tajikistan

References

External links
Shear-wave polarizations in the Peter the First Range indicating crack-induced anisotropy in a thrust-fault regime

Mountain ranges of Tajikistan
Districts of Republican Subordination
Pamir Mountains